The Battle of Bolnisi was fought in 1228 AD near Bolnisi, then part of the Kingdom of Georgia. The invading Khwarazmid Empire was led by Jalal ad-Din Mingburnu, its last Sultan, who was driven from his realm by the Mongol Empire and was trying to recapture lost territories. Georgia assembled its own coalition against Jalal ad-Din: Georgians, Kipchaks, Alans, Vainakhs and Leks assembled 40,000 men. Ill-prepared for battle, the coalition went south to Bolnisi where Jalal ad-Din's forces were waiting. Jalal ad-Din saw Kipchak banners, consisting 20,000 men in the Georgian ranks and appealed to them, 'lending a certain Qoshqar to them with a loaf of bread and salt to remind them of their 'former obligations' to his house. The Kipchaks withdrew support from the Georgians. The battle ended with a Khwarezmid victory and is marked as a disastrous event in Georgian history due to betrayal.

References

Sources 
 Guchava V., Georgian Soviet Encyclopedia, II, p. 452–453, Tbilisi, 1977

Bolnisi
Bolnisi
Bolnisi
Bolnisi
1228 in Asia
1228 in Europe
13th century in the Kingdom of Georgia
Bolnisi